Vepříkov is a municipality and village in Havlíčkův Brod District in the Vysočina Region of the Czech Republic. It has about 300 inhabitants.

Administrative parts
The village of Miřátky is an administrative part of Vepříkov.

Gallery

References

Villages in Havlíčkův Brod District